Douglas William Krum, Jr. (born April 27, 1977), who goes by the stage name Krum (formerly Harry Krum or  Playdough), is an American hip hop musician. He's released nine studio albums, one extended play, and three mixtapes in his career.

Early life
He was born Douglas William Krum, Jr., on April 27, 1977 in Toledo, Ohio, to father Douglas William Krum, Sr. and mother Lynn Marie Krum (née Edelstein). He grew up in Borger, Texas, and as a teen he was discovered by Uprok Records while in the group Ill Harmonics, after that group appeared in a movie. This got his music recording career underway.

Music career
He started his music recording career around 2000, when his first studio album, Lonely Superstar, was released by UpRok Records on October 22, 2002. His second studio album, Don't Drink the Water, was released on October 17, 2006, from 7Spin Music. The subsequent release, Goodonya, an extended play, was released by Deepspace5 Recordings on December 18, 2008. His next release, a mixtape entitled Bible Bus, was released independently on June 29, 2010. His third studio album, Writer Dye, was released on November 2, 2010, also independently.  He released a fourth studio album, Hotdoggin, on April 26, 2011. His fifth studio album, Writer Dye: Deux or Die, was released on October 22, 2012. A second mixtape, Christopher Collabo with DJ Sean P, was released on January 29, 2013, independently. He released Gold Tips with DJ Sean P, his sixth studio album, on April 8, 2014, through Man Bites Dog Records. A seventh studio album, 1985 Party Time Excellent, was released independently on March 3, 2015. His eighth studio album, We Buy Gold with DJ Sean P, was released on October 16, 2015.  His ninth studio album, Blue Eyed Devil was released on February 3, 2017.

Discography
Studio albums
 Lonely Superstar (October 22, 2002, UpRok)
 Don't Drink the Water (October 17, 2006, 7Spin, Sony Records)
 Writer Dye (November 2, 2010)
 Hotdoggin (April 26, 2011, Writer Dye)
 Writer Dye: Deux or Dye (October 22, 2012)
 Gold Tips (April 8, 2014, Man Bites Dog, with Sean Patrick)
 1985 Party Time Excellent (March 3, 2015, with DJ Sean P)
 We Buy Gold (October 16, 2015, with DJ Sean P)
 Blue Eyed Devil (February 3, 2017)
 Black Lung (April 2, 2021)

EPs
 Goodonya (December 18, 2008, Deepspace5)
 Muddy Squirrel Tape (December 2019)

Mixtapes
 Bible Bus (June 29, 2010)
 Christopher Collabo (January 29, 2013, with DJ Sean P)

Beat Tapes
 Whos Harry Krum (July 7, 2009)
 Dirty Harry (September 12, 2014)

References

External links
 Official website
 Jesus Freak Hideout 2002 interview
 Jesus Freak Hideout 2011 interview

1977 births
Living people
American performers of Christian music
Musicians from Ohio
Musicians from Dallas
Songwriters from Ohio
Songwriters from Texas
Deepspace5 members